Ambovombe-Androy , or just Ambovombe, is a city in the far south of Madagascar, and the capital of the Androy region. Ambovombe has now acquired city status with an officially estimated population in 2018 of 114,230.

The city is connected by the Route nationale 13 with Taolagnaro (110 km) to the east. The RN 13 also leads north to Ihosy (383 km), and the Route nationale 10 north-west to Toliara, but these roads are in bad condition.

Agriculture
There are commercial sisal plantations near this town.

References

Populated places in Androy
Regional capitals in Madagascar